Andrew Plummer FRCP (1697–1756) was a Scottish physician and chemist. He was professor of chemistry at the University of Edinburgh from 1726 to 1755. He developed ideas on the attractive and repulsive forces involved in chemical affinity, which later had influence on his successors William Cullen and Joseph Black. He compounded "Plummer's pills", a mixture of calomel and antimony sulfide with guaiacum; the pills were originally compounded to treat psoriasis but were used for more than a century as an antisyphilitic.

References

1697 births
1756 deaths
Members of the Philosophical Society of Edinburgh
18th-century Scottish medical doctors
Scottish physicists
Academics of the University of Edinburgh
Alumni of the University of Edinburgh
Leiden University alumni